Ruisseau-des-Mineurs is an unorganized territory in the Bas-Saint-Laurent region of Quebec, Canada. It is named after the Miners Creek (ruisseau des Mineurs), a tributary of the Cascapédia River via the Branche du Lac River.

The Dunière Wildlife Reserve is located within this territory.

Demographics
Population trend:
 Population in 2021: 5 (2016 to 2021 population change: N/A)
 Population in 2016: 0 
 Population in 2011: 0
 Population in 2006: 5
 Population in 2001: 0
 Population in 1996: 0
 Population in 1991: 0

Private dwellings occupied by usual residents: 4 (total dwellings: 27)

See also
 List of unorganized territories in Quebec

References

Unorganized territories in Bas-Saint-Laurent
La Matapédia Regional County Municipality